Manresa is the capital of Bages in Catalonia, Spain.

Manresa may also refer to:

Buildings
 Manresa House, Dublin, Republic of Ireland
Manresa Island, Connecticut, USA
 Manresa Jesuit Spiritual Renewal Centre, in Pickering, Ontario, Canada
 Manresa (restaurant), Former Michelin-starred restaurant in Los Gatos, California, USA
 Manresa School, Panama
 Manresa Spirituality Centre, Quebec, Canada
 Parkstead House, formerly Manresa House, London, UK

Places
 Manresa State Beach, California, USA